Michael Parkes (born October 12, 1944 in Sikeston, Missouri) is an American-born artist living in Spain who is best known for work in the areas of fantasy art and magic realism. He specializes in painting, stone lithography and sculpture.  He also creates limited-edition Giclée images.

Biography 
Parkes studied graphic art and painting at the University of Kansas. As a student, Parkes was fascinated by various graphic processes, and he later became proficient in the difficult medium of the colour stone lithograph.  Many of his recent works have been produced as Aurographics, limited edition giclée prints.

His unique style evolved in isolation, after a period in which he gave up the practice of art altogether and went to India in search of philosophical illumination, a location that he and his wife continue to visit annually.

Early on, he painted in the generally abstract expressionist style common among his teachers.  However, he later began to draw and paint in a meticulous style of detailed representation. This style is realistic in principle, but often uses magical subject matter, with imagery drawn from a range of traditions including the cabalistic and the tantric. Strange beasts encounter mysterious winged women, good and evil fight out their eternal conflict.

Several of Parkes' works have been used as cover illustrations, including:
 OMNI (Dec 1980, June 1980, Nov 1981)
  The Best of Omni Science Fiction, No. 6 (1983)
  Omni Best Science Fiction One (1992)
 Omni Best Science Fiction Three (1993) 
  Full Spectrum 5 (1995, 1996)
 ParaSpheres: Extending Beyond the Spheres of Literary and Genre Fiction: Fabulist and New Wave Fabulist Stories (2006).
 Karma in Christianity - Charles Pradeep (2011)

A Parkes sculpture, Angel Affair (2004), was the Sep/Oct 2004 cover illustration for the Dutch-language Fine Arts Magazine, which also contained a feature article on one of Parkes' exhibitions in the Netherlands.

Lisa Starry of Scorpius Dance Theater, Phoenix Arizona in 2007 choreographed a contemporary dance presentation based on the works of Parkes. Also in 2007, Parkes was invited to exhibit a painting of his own vision of Venus at an international exhibition of 35 magic realism artists in Denmark.

In 2009, one of Parkes' paintings, The Three Graces, is repeatedly mentioned in Dan Brown's novel The Lost Symbol.  Parkes was interviewed for his interpretation of the symbolic use of his art in Brown's book by Daniel Burstein.  Milliner Justin Smith has said his design for the horned headpiece worn by actress Angelina Jolie in the 2014 film Maleficent was inspired in part by Michael Parkes lithographs.

Philosophy
Parkes, who has described consciousness as a laboratory to explore the physicality of evolution, finds value in meditation and admires the 19th-century Indian philosopher, Sri Aurobindo.

Awards
Association of Science Fiction & Fantasy Artists (ASFA) - Chesley Awards
1994	Best Cover Illustration: Paperback Book	- Omni Best Science Fiction Three (nominee)
2003 Best Product Illustration - "The Court Painter" (nominee)

References

Further reading
 Hans Redeker [translation into English by Michael O’Loughlin]. Michael Parkes: paintings, drawings, stonelithographs, 1977-1992 Steltman Editions, Amsterdam (1993) 189 p.
 John Russell Taylor The World of Michael Parkes Steltman Editions, Amsterdam (1999), 200 pp.
 John Russell Taylor Michael Parkes: Stone Lithographs - Bronze Sculptures Steltman Editions, Amsterdam. (November 1996)
 John Russell Taylor: "The Art of Michael Parkes" Small Press Distribution; First Edition (January 2006), 215 pp.
 Marcel Salome and Claus Brusen, eds. "Dreamscape" Salbru Publishing, Amsterdam (October 27, 2006), foreword by Michael Parkes, 128 pp.
 
 "DREAMSCAPES: Contemporary Imaginary Realism 2009" Publisher: Imaginary Editions (2009) 164 pp.

External links
 

1944 births
Living people
20th-century American painters
American male painters
21st-century American painters
21st-century American male artists
Fantasy artists
People from Sikeston, Missouri
20th-century American printmakers
Painters from Missouri
20th-century American male artists